Abdul Malik bin Mat Ariff (born 7 January 1991), commonly known as Malik Ariff is a Malaysian footballer who plays as a winger or forward for K League 1 club Jeonbuk Hyundai Motors.

Malik is widely regarded as one of the hottest prospects in Pahang football. He is known as an energetic, quick and accomplished finisher.

Career statistics

Club

Honours

Club
Pahang
Malaysia Cup (2): 2013, 2014
FA Cup (1): 2014
Malaysian Charity Shield (1): 2014
Piala Emas Raja-Raja (1): 2011
 Top Scorer for President Cup 2012 : Winner

References

External links
 

1991 births
Living people
Malaysian footballers
Sri Pahang FC players
Terengganu FC players
People from Pahang
Malaysian people of Malay descent
Association football forwards